Harry Lee may refer to:

Sports
 Harry Lee (cricketer) (1890–1981), English cricketer
 Harry Lee (tennis) (1907–1998), British tennis player
 Harry Lee (athlete) (1877–1937), American track and field athlete
 Harry Lee (footballer, born 1887) (1887–?), English football forward
 Harry Lee (footballer, born 1933), English footballer
 Harry Lee (footballer, born 1995), English footballer
 Harry Lee (footballer, born 2004), English footballer
 Harry Lee (Canadian football) (1932–2019), Canadian football player

Military
 Harry Lee (United States Marine) (1872–1935), US Marine Corps General and military governor of Santo Domingo
 Henry Lee III (1756–1818), Revolutionary War general and Congressman, nicknamed "Light Horse Harry"

Others
 Harry Lee Kuan Yew (1923–2015), first Prime Minister of Singapore
 Harry David Lee (1849–1928), American businessman
 Harry Lee (sheriff) (1932–2007), Chinese-American sheriff of Jefferson Parish, Louisiana
 Harry W. Lee (1865–1932), British socialist activist
 Harry Lee (shell collector) (living), American shell collector

See also
 Henry Lee (disambiguation)
 Harold Lee (disambiguation)
 Harry Leigh (1888–?), British footballer